Horace Freeland Judson (April 21, 1931 – May 6, 2011) was a journalist and later with more prominence a historian of molecular biology including authoring several books, including The Eighth Day of Creation, a history of molecular biology, and The Great Betrayal: Fraud in Science, an examination of the deliberate manipulation of scientific data.

Life and career
Horace Freeland Judson was born on 21 April 1931, in Manhattan, New York. He contracted polio at the age of 13, and the disease left him with a withered right arm. Judson matriculated at the University of Chicago at age 15 and graduated with a bachelor's degree in 1948, and worked for seven years for Time magazine as a European correspondent in London and Paris. He subsequently wrote for The New Yorker, Harper's, and Nature among others. Judson spent nine years on the faculty of Johns Hopkins University and then four years as a research scholar at Stanford University. He was the director of the now defunct Center for History of Recent Science and Research Professor of History at George Washington University. In 1987 Judson was awarded a MacArthur Fellowship.

The Eighth Day of Creation arose out of Judson's acquaintance with Max Perutz; In 1968 came the idea of a book about the discovery of the structures of cellular macromolecules. Following a discussion with Jacques Monod in 1969, Judson expanded his planned book to a general history of molecular biology. The result is based on interviews of over 100 scientists, cross-checked and re-interviewed over a period of seven years. The book was partially serialized in three issues of The New Yorker in November and December 1978. Following the publication of the book, Judson deposited the tapes and transcripts of the interviews at the American Philosophical Society in Philadelphia, Pennsylvania.

He appears in Dont Look Back, D. A. Pennebaker's documentary film about Bob Dylan, in which he is subjected to what he believed to be a contrived tirade of abuse from Dylan. During Judson's interview, Dylan launches into a verbal attack on Time magazine, and Judson himself. The film's producer Pennebaker does not believe the tirade was planned, but notes that Dylan backed off, not wanting to come across as being too cruel. However, Judson believed the confrontation was contrived to make the sequence more entertaining. "That evening", said Judson, "I went to the concert. My opinion then and now was that the music was unpleasant, the lyrics inflated, and Dylan, a self-indulgent whining show off".

Personal life
Judson's first marriage ended in divorce. His second wife, Penelope Jones, died in 1993. Horace Freeland Judson's oldest daughter, Grace Judson, is a leadership consultant and trainer. After her successful 25-year corporate career, she won the title of Fastest Knitter in America in 2002, appearing on Good Morning America in October of that year.  His younger daughter, Olivia Judson, is a science journalist and currently a research fellow as an evolutionary biologist at Imperial College London and is the author of the best-selling Dr. Tatiana's Sex Advice to All Creation.  His younger son, Nicholas Judson, was a scientist at the J. Craig Venter Institute (Rockville, MD), but left science to pursue a new career as a self-employed artist. Judson was an atheist.

Publications

Articles

Books 
Heroin Addiction: What Americans Can Learn from the English Experience (1975). Vintage Books, 
The Search for Solutions (1982). Holt Rinehart & Winston, 
Science in Crisis at the Millennium (1999). New York Academy of Sciences,

See also
 List of books about the politics of science
 Plastic Fantastic: How the Biggest Fraud in Physics Shook the Scientific World

References

External links
His daughter reminisces as she clears out his house:  http://opinionator.blogs.nytimes.com/category/the-task/</ref>

1931 births
American historians
American science writers
2011 deaths
MacArthur Fellows
University of Chicago alumni